Michael J. Kolb (born c. 1960) is an American anthropologist. He currently holds the position of Professor of Anthropology at Metropolitan State University of Denver and Presidential Teaching Professor Emeritus at Northern Illinois University, where he also served as Associate Vice Provost.

Kolb received his Ph.D. from the University of California, Los Angeles in 1991. Kolb has done field work in Polynesia, Europe, and Africa. Most of his recent contributions have been in the area of social stratification and the political economy of the Maui Kingdom in Hawaii, and the rise of complexity in early Iron Age Sicily.

At MSU Denver Kolb teaches courses in archaeology as well as in field methods, ethnohistory, quantitative analysis, and method and theory.

Kolb has worked in Hawaii as the director of the Na Heiau O Maui project, where he conducted an extensive study of ancient Maui temples published in Current Anthropology suggesting that the island temple system was 400 years older than previously thought.

Kolb has also been the director of the Elymi Project in western Sicily, which aims to "describe human landscape transformations around three hilltop settlements" in western Sicily.  He has conducted archaeological survey in western Sicily since 1998, revealing a rich settlement system in the community of Salemi that dates from the Copper Age to the medieval period, many of the sites being reoccupied over time. Kolb has also excavated at nearing Salemi, recovering finds that document the presence of residual 6th century BC activity and 4th–3rd century BC settlement, lending credence to the idea that Salemi is the ancient city of Halyciae of the Elymians. He has also discovered what appears to be medieval mosque while investigating Salemi's Norman castle.

References

External links
 Scholarly publications from ResearchGate 
 Official profile from Metropolitan State University of Denver
 Official profile from Northern Illinois University

Year of birth missing (living people)
Living people
American anthropologists
Northern Illinois University faculty
University of California, Los Angeles alumni